Raphaël Piolanti (born 14 November 1967 in Metz) is a retired male hammer thrower from France. His personal best throw is 79.68 metres, achieved in September 1992 in Bourgoin-Jallieu.  This was a French record at that time.

In November 1993 he was found guilty of sexual assault on fellow athletes Catherine Moyon de Baecque and Michelle Rouveyrol. He allegedly raped them during an athletics camp in August 1991.

Piolanti is now president and coach in Athletic Club Amneville – the athletic club he has been in his entire career. He has trained several high calibre throwers at the club including Jerome Bortoluzzi, Maxime Maier, Quentin Bigot, and Bruno Boccalate.

In July 2014 he was accused of supporting the doping of athletes, including Quentin Bigot.

Achievements

References

1967 births
Living people
French male hammer throwers
French people of Italian descent
Athletes (track and field) at the 1992 Summer Olympics
Athletes (track and field) at the 1996 Summer Olympics
Olympic athletes of France
Sportspeople from Metz
Mediterranean Games gold medalists for France
Mediterranean Games silver medalists for France
Mediterranean Games bronze medalists for France
Mediterranean Games medalists in athletics
Athletes (track and field) at the 1991 Mediterranean Games
Athletes (track and field) at the 1997 Mediterranean Games
Athletes (track and field) at the 2001 Mediterranean Games